The 2018 NC State Wolfpack baseball team represented North Carolina State University during the 2018 NCAA Division I baseball season. The Wolfpack played their home games at Doak Field as a member of the Atlantic Coast Conference. They were led by head coach Elliott Avent, his 22nd season at NC State. The Wolfpack finished the season 2nd in the ACC's Atlantic Division with a record of 42–18, 19–11 in conference play. They qualified for the 2018 Atlantic Coast Conference baseball tournament, and were eliminated in pool play. They were invited to host the Raleigh Regional in the 2018 NCAA Division I baseball tournament. They lost in the regional final to Auburn.

Previous season
In 2017, the Wolfpack finished the season 4th in the ACC's Atlantic Division with a record of 36–25, 16–14 in conference play. They qualified for the 2017 Atlantic Coast Conference baseball tournament, and were eliminated in pool play. They were invited to the 2017 NCAA Division I baseball tournament, where they participated in the Lexington Regional, where they lost in the regional final to host Kentucky.

Personnel

Roster

Coaching staff

Source:

Schedule

! style="background:#CC0000;color:white;"| Regular Season
|- valign="top" 

|- align="center" bgcolor="#bbffbb"
| February 16 || * || 23 || Doak Field • Raleigh, NC || W 8–4 || Brown (1–0) || McCarthy (0–1) || Johnston (1) || 2,588 || 1–0 || –
|- align="center" bgcolor="#bbffbb"
| February 16 || Seton Hall* || 23 || Doak Field • Raleigh, NC || W 3–1 || Piedmonte (1–0) || Politi (0–1) || O'Donnell (1) || 2,719 || 2–0 || –
|- align="center" bgcolor="#ffbbbb"
| February 18 || Seton Hall* || 23 || Doak Field • Raleigh, NC || L 6–7 || Espinal (1–0) || Harrison (0–1) || Leon (1) || 2,719 || 2–1 || –
|- align="center" bgcolor="#bbffbb"
| February 20 || * || 24 || Doak Field • Raleigh, NC || W 9–7 || Justice (1–0) || Bottenfield (0–1) || O'Donnell (2) || 2,179 || 3–1 || –
|- align="center" bgcolor="#bbffbb"
| February 21 || * || 24 || Doak Field • Raleigh, NC || W 9–6 || Klyman (1–0) || Perry (0–1) || O'Donnell (3) || 2,340 || 4–1 || –
|- align="center" bgcolor="#bbffbb"
| February 23 || * || 24 || Doak Field • Raleigh, NC || W 10–0 || Brown (2–0) || Schuermann (1–1) || None || 2,548 || 5–1 || –
|- align="center" bgcolor="#bbffbb"
| February 24 || Furman* || 24 || Doak Field • Raleigh, NC || W 9–2 || Piedmonte (2–0) || Crawford (0–1) || Johnston (2) || 2,978 || 6–1 || –
|- align="center" bgcolor="#bbffbb"
| February 25 || Furman* || 24 || Doak Field • Raleigh, NC || W 9–0 || Clenney (1–0) || Lazzaro (0–1) || None || 2,291 || 7–1 || –
|- align="center" bgcolor="#bbffbb"
| February 26 || *  || 16 || Doak Field • Raleigh, NC || W 15–5 || Bienlien (1–0) || Biancalana (0–1) || None || 2,073 || 8–1 || –
|-

|- align="center" bgcolor="#bbffbb"
| March 2 || * || 16 || Doak Field • Raleigh, NC || W 11–1 || Brown (3–0) || Carey (1–1) || None || 2,176 || 9–1 || –
|- align="center" bgcolor="#bbffbb"
| March 3 || * || 16 || Doak Field • Raleigh, NC || W 21–4 || Swiney (1–0) || Horrell (1–1) || Gauthier (1) || 2,440 || 10–1 || –
|- align="center" bgcolor="#ffbbbb"
| March 4 || * || 16 || Doak Field • Raleigh, NC || L 2–3 || Ginther (1–0) || O'Donnell (0–1) || Smith (4) || 2,335 || 10–2 || –
|- align="center" bgcolor="#bbbbbb"
| March 6 || * || 17 || Doak Field • Raleigh, NC ||  ||  ||  ||  ||  || – || –
|- align="center" bgcolor="#bbffbb"
| March 7 || at Campbell* || 17 || Jim Perry Stadium • Buies Creek, NC || W 4–1 || Justice (2–0) || Winans (1–2) || Johnston (3) || 734 || 11–2 || –
|- align="center" bgcolor="#bbffbb"
| March 9 ||  || 17 || Doak Field • Raleigh, NC || W 2–1 || Johnston (1–0) || Stevens (1–2) || Klyman (1) || 2,227 || 12–2 || 1–0
|- align="center" bgcolor="#bbffbb"
| March 10 || Boston College || 17 || Doak Field • Raleigh, NC || W 13–7 || Swiney (2–0) || Metzdorf (0–2) || Klyman (2) || 2,266 || 13–2 || 2–0
|- align="center" bgcolor="#ffbbbb"
| March 10 || Boston College || 17 || Doak Field • Raleigh, NC || L 3–11 || Rapp (2–1) || Harrison (0–2) || None || 2,471 || 13–3 || 2–1
|- align="center" bgcolor="#bbffbb"
| March 13 || * || 19 || Doak Field • Raleigh, NC || W 15–11 || Clenney (2–0) || Juday (0–1) || None || 2,102 || 14–3 || 2–1
|- align="center" bgcolor="#bbffbb"
| March 14 || UNC–Asheville* || 19 || Doak Field • Raleigh, NC || W 6–2 || Johnston (2–0) || Brown (0–1) || None || 2,077 || 15–3 || 2–1
|- align="center" bgcolor="#bbffbb"
| March 16 || at No. 2 Clemson || 19 || Doug Kingsmore Stadium • Clemson, SC || W 4–0 || Bienlien (2–0) || Hennessy (1–1) || Klyman (3) || 4,679 || 16–3 || 3–1
|- align="center" bgcolor="#bbffbb"
| March 17 || at No. 2 Clemson || 19 || Doug Kingsmore Stadium • Clemson, SC || W 6–1 || Brown (4–0) || Crawford (1–1) || Johnston (4) || 5,008 || 17–3 || 4–1
|- align="center" bgcolor="#bbffbb"
| March 18 || at No. 2 Clemson || 19 || Doug Kingsmore Stadium • Clemson, SC || W 5–4 || O'Donnell (1–1) || Miller (2–1) || None || 4,540 || 18–3 || 5–1
|- align="center" bgcolor="#ffbbbb"
| March 23 ||  || 8 || Doak Field • Raleigh, NC || L 4–13 || Curry (5–0) || Bienlien (2–1) || None || 2,391 || 18–4 || 5–2
|- align="center" bgcolor="#bbffbb"
| March 23 || Georgia Tech || 8 || Doak Field • Raleigh, NC || W 5–2 || Piedmonte (3–0) || Thomas (2–3) || O'Donnell (4) || 2,698 || 19–4 || 6–2
|- align="center" bgcolor="#bbffbb"
| March 25 || Georgia Tech || 8 || Doak Field • Raleigh, NC || W 9–6 || Klyman (2–0) || Datoc (0–3) || None || 2,346 || 20–4 || 7–2
|- align="center" bgcolor="#bbffbb"
| March 27 || * || 6 || Doak Field • Raleigh, NC || W 3–2 || Swiney (3–0) || DiCesare (2–4) || O'Donnell (5) || 2,201 || 21–4 || 7–2
|- align="center" bgcolor="#ffbbbb"
| March 29 || at  || 6 || English Field • Blacksburg, VA || L 2–10 || Coward (2–2) || Bienlien (2–2) || None || 572 || 21–5 || 7–3
|- align="center" bgcolor="#bbffbb"
| March 30 || at Virginia Tech || 6 || English Field • Blacksburg, VA || W 10–2 || Piedmonte (4–0) || Scherzer (1–2) || None || 697 || 22–5 || 8–3
|- align="center" bgcolor="#bbffbb"
| March 31 || at Virginia Tech || 6 || English Field • Blacksburg, VA || W 1–0 || Johnston (3–0) || McDonald (1–5) || O'Donnell (6) || 807 || 23–5 || 9–3
|-

|- align="center" bgcolor="#ffbbbb"
| April 6 || at No. 11  || 4 || Jim Patterson Stadium • Louisville, KY || L 2–8 || Wolf (4–2) || Piedmonte (4–1) || None || 3,125 || 23–6 || 9–4
|- align="center" bgcolor="#bbffbb"
| April 7 || at No. 11 Louisville || 4 || Jim Patterson Stadium • Louisville, KY || W 9–6 || Klyman (3–0) || Bordner (1–2) || None || 2,117 || 24–6 || 10–4
|- align="center" bgcolor="#bbffbb"
| April 8 || at No. 11 Louisville || 4 || Jim Patterson Stadium • Louisville, KY || W 10–3 || Clenney (3–0) || Miller (3–1) || None || 2,192 || 25–6 || 11–4
|- align="center" bgcolor="#bbffbb"
| April 11 || at UNC–Wilmington* || 2 || Brooks Field • Wilmington, NC || W 8–3 || Johnston (4–0) || Easter (3–2) || None || 2,155 || 26–6 || 11–4
|- align="center" bgcolor="#ffbbbb"
| April 13 ||  || 2 || Doak Field • Raleigh, NC || L 8–12 || Holubecki (2–1) || Klyman (3–1) || Kmet (7) || 3,048 || 26–7 || 11–5
|- align="center" bgcolor="#bbffbb"
| April 14 || Notre Dame || 2 || Doak Field • Raleigh, NC || W 12–2 || Brown (5–0) || Sheehan (1–4) || None || 3,048 || 27–7 || 12–5
|- align="center" bgcolor="#bbffbb"
| April 14 || Notre Dame || 2 || Doak Field • Raleigh, NC || W 13–5 || Bienlien (3–2) || Junker (0–4) || O'Donnell (7) || 3,048 || 28–7 || 13–5
|- align="center" bgcolor="#bbffbb"
| April 17 || vs No. 8 North Carolina* || 2 || Durham Bulls Athletic Park • Durham, NC || W 8–3 || Johnston (5–0) || Hutchison (3–2) || None || 6,799 || 29–7 || 13–5
|- align="center" bgcolor="#bbffbb"
| April 20 || at No. 3  || 2 || Jack Coombs Field • Durham, NC || W 9–2 || Johnston (6–0) || Laskey (6–3) || None || 1,844 || 30–7 || 14–5
|- align="center" bgcolor="#bbffbb"
| April 21 || at No. 3 Duke || 2 || Jack Coombs Field • Durham, NC || W 2–1 || Brown (6–0) || Stallings (3–3) || O'Donnell (7) || 2,000 || 31–7 || 15–5
|- align="center" bgcolor="#ffbbbb"
| April 22 || at No. 3 Duke || 2 || Jack Coombs Field • Durham, NC || L 2–11 || Day (2–2) || Bienlien (3–3) || None || 2,000 || 31–8 || 15–6
|- align="center" bgcolor="#bbbbbb"
| April 24 || No. 15 * || 3 || Doak Field • Raleigh, NC ||  ||  ||  ||  ||  || – || –
|- align="center" bgcolor="#ffbbbb"
| April 27 || No. 6 North Carolina || 3 || Doak Field • Raleigh, NC || L 5–6 || Casparius (1–0) || Klyman (3–2) || Lancellotti (1) || 3,048 || 31–9 || 15–7
|- align="center" bgcolor="#ffbbbb"
| April 28 || No. 6 North Carolina || 3 || Doak Field • Raleigh, NC || L 6–8 || Bergner (5–1) || Brown (6–1) || Daniels (2) || 3,048 || 31–10 || 15–8
|- align="center" bgcolor="#ffbbbb"
| April 29 || No. 6 North Carolina || 3 || Doak Field • Raleigh, NC || L 4–5 || O'Brien (4–0) || Piedmonte (4–2) || Casparius (1) || 3,048 || 31–11 || 15–9
|-

|- align="center" bgcolor="#ffbbbb"
| May 2 || Campbell* || 7 || Doak Field • Raleigh, NC || L 4–5 || Thomas (3–0) || O'Donnell (1–2) || Messer (7) || 2,802 || 31–12 || 15–9
|- align="center" bgcolor="#bbffbb"
| May 4 || *  || 7 || Doak Field • Raleigh, NC || W 5–0 || Johnston (7–0) || Sheehan (2–7) || None || 2,855 || 32–12 || 15–9
|- align="center" bgcolor="#bbffbb"
| May 5 || William & Mary* || 7 || Doak Field • Raleigh, NC || W 8–4 || Klyman (4–2) || Haney (1–7) || None || 2,924 || 33–12 || 15–9
|- align="center" bgcolor="#bbffbb"
| May 6 || William & Mary* || 7 || Doak Field • Raleigh, NC || W 7–3 || Swiney (3–0) || Farrell (2–4) || None || 1,238 || 34–12 || 15–9
|- align="center" bgcolor="#bbffbb"
| May 8 || * || 7 || Doak Field • Raleigh, NC || W 7–3 || Klyman (5–2) || Jones (0–1) || O'Donnell (9) || 2,623 || 35–12 || 15–9
|- align="center" bgcolor="#bbffbb"
| May 9 || James Madison* || 7 || Doak Field • Raleigh, NC || W 15–2 || Harrison (1–2) || Richards (0–2) || None || 2,300 || 36–12 || 15–9
|- align="center" bgcolor="#bbffbb"
| May 11 ||  || 7 || Doak Field • Raleigh, NC || W 8–5 || Klyman (6–2) || Menendez (0–4) || None || 3,039 || 37–12 || 16–9
|- align="center" bgcolor="#bbffbb"
| May 12 || Wake Forest || 7 || Doak Field • Raleigh, NC || W 7–5 || Piedmonte (5–2) || Shuster (0–3) || O'Donnell (10) || 3,048 || 38–12 || 17–9
|- align="center" bgcolor="#bbffbb"
| May 13 || Wake Forest || 7 || Doak Field • Raleigh, NC || W 10–6 || Centala (1–0) || Witt (2–4) || Klyman (4) || 2,767 || 39–12 || 18–9
|- align="center" bgcolor="#ffbbbb"
| May 17 || at No. 22  || 7 || Dick Howser Stadium • Tallahassee, FL || L 3–4 (11) || Van Eyk (5–0) || O'Donnell (1–3) || None || 3,682 || 39–13 || 18–10
|- align="center" bgcolor="#ffbbbb"
| May 18 || at No. 22 Florida State || 7 || Dick Howser Stadium • Tallahassee, FL || L 3–6 (10) || Van Eyk (6–0) || Piedmonte (5–3) || None || 4,119 || 39–14 || 18–11
|- align="center" bgcolor="#bbffbb"
| May 19 || at No. 22 Florida State || 7 || Dick Howser Stadium • Tallahassee, FL || W 5–3 || Klyman (7–2) || Sands (7–3) || O'Donnell (11) || 4,416 || 40–14 || 19–11
|-

|- 
! style="background:#CC0000;color:white;"| Post-Season
|-

|- align="center" bgcolor="#ffbbbb"
| May 24 || vs (10)  || 8 (3) || Durham Bulls Athletic Park • Durham, NC || L 2–4 || Casey (7–4) || Harrison (1–3) || Sousa (6) || 4,115 || 40–15 || 0–1
|- align="center" bgcolor="#ffbbbb"
| May 25 || vs No. 16 (6) Florida State || 8 (3) || Durham Bulls Athletic Park • Durham, NC || L 2–5 || Parrish (5–0) || Brown (6–2) || None || 7,228 || 40–16 || 0–2
|-

|- align="center" bgcolor="#ffbbbb"
| June 1 || (4)  || 9 (1) || Doak Field • Raleigh, NC || L 1–5 || Giovinco (9–5) || Johnston (7–1) || None || 3,048 || 40–17 || 0–1
|- align="center" bgcolor="#bbffbb"
| June 2 || (3)  || 9 (1) || Doak Field • Raleigh, NC || W 9–3 || Brown (7–2) || Stiehl (3–2) || None || 2,543 || 41–17 || 1–1
|- align="center" bgcolor="#bbffbb"
| June 3 || (4) Army || 9 (1) || Doak Field • Raleigh, NC || W 11–1 || Klyman (8–2) || Ball (7–3) || None || 2,665 || 42–17 || 2–1
|- align="center" bgcolor="#ffbbbb"
| June 3 || (2)  || 9 (1) || Doak Field • Raleigh, NC || L 7–15 || Greenhill (5–2) || Harrison (1–4) || None || 2,771 || 42–18 || 2–2
|-

|- 
| style="font-size:88%" | All rankings from Collegiate Baseball.
|-
| Source:

Ranking movements

References

NC State Wolfpack
NC State Wolfpack baseball seasons
NC State Wolfpack
NC State